Hilde Singsaas (born 13 March 1972) is a Norwegian politician for the Labour Party.

During the cabinet Jagland, she was appointed political advisor in the Ministry of Children and Family Affairs. During the first cabinet Stoltenberg, she was again appointed political advisor, this time in the Office of the Prime Minister. In 2006, during the second cabinet Stoltenberg, she was appointed State Secretary in the Office of the Prime Minister.

She took her education at the University of Oslo, and has worked as an advisor in ECON (2002–2005) and the Norwegian branch of the Red Cross (2005–).

References 

 Regjeringen.no biography 

1972 births
Living people
Labour Party (Norway) politicians
Norwegian state secretaries
Politicians from Oslo
University of Oslo alumni
Norwegian women state secretaries
21st-century Norwegian women politicians
21st-century Norwegian politicians